Sirhan Bishara Sirhan (Sirḥān Bišāra Sirḥān, born March 19, 1944) is a Palestinian Jordanian man who was convicted of the June 5, 1968, assassination of Robert F. Kennedy. Sirhan shot Kennedy, a United States Senator and brother of President John F. Kennedy, at the Ambassador Hotel in Los Angeles, California; Kennedy died the next day at Good Samaritan Hospital.

Sirhan was born to an Arab Christian family in Jerusalem, where he attended a Lutheran school. In 1989, he told David Frost: "My only connection with Robert Kennedy was his sole support of Israel and his deliberate attempt to send those 50 bombers to Israel to obviously do harm to the Palestinians." Some scholars believe that the assassination was the first major incident of political violence in the U.S. stemming from the Palestinian–Israeli conflict in the Middle East.

Sirhan was convicted of murder and is serving a life sentence at the Richard J. Donovan Correctional Facility in San Diego County, California. On August 27, 2021, after years of being denied parole, he was granted parole by a two-person panel of the California parole board. Prosecutors declined to participate or to oppose his release under a policy by Los Angeles County District Attorney George Gascón. On January 13, 2022, Governor Gavin Newsom blocked Sirhan's release on parole. He was denied parole again on March 1, 2023.

Early life
Sirhan Sirhan was born into an Arab Palestinian Christian family in Mandatory Palestine, in Jerusalem's Musrara neighborhood, and became a Jordanian citizen after Jordan annexed the West Bank. According to his mother, Sirhan was traumatized as a child by the violence he witnessed in the Arab–Israeli conflict, including the death of his older brother, who was run over by a military vehicle that was swerving to evade gunfire.

When Sirhan was 12 years old, his family immigrated to the U.S., moving briefly to New York and then to California. He attended Eliot Junior High School, John Muir High School, and Pasadena City College. Shortly after the family's move to California, Bishara returned alone to the Middle East. Standing  and weighing  at age 20, Sirhan moved to Corona to train to be a jockey while working at a stable, but lost his job and abandoned the pursuit after suffering a head injury in a racing accident.

Sirhan never became an American citizen, instead retaining his Jordanian citizenship.

As an adult, Sirhan changed church denominations several times, joining Baptist and Seventh-day Adventist churches. In 1966, he joined the esoteric organization Ancient Mystical Order of the Rose Cross, one of the Rosicrucian Orders.

Robert F. Kennedy assassination

Around 12:15 a.m. PDT on June 5, 1968, Sirhan fired a .22 LR Iver-Johnson Cadet revolver at United States Senator Robert F. Kennedy and the crowd surrounding him in the Ambassador Hotel in Los Angeles, shortly after Kennedy had finished addressing supporters in the hotel's main ballroom. Authors George Plimpton, Jimmy Breslin, Pete Hamill, former professional football player Rosey Grier, and 1960 Olympic gold medalist Rafer Johnson were among several men who subdued and disarmed Sirhan after a struggle.

Kennedy was shot three times—once in the head and twice in the back—with a fourth bullet passing through his jacket. He died almost 26 hours later at Good Samaritan Hospital. Five other people at the event were also shot, all of whom recovered: Paul Schrade, an official with the United Automobile Workers union; William Weisel, an ABC TV unit manager; Ira Goldstein, a reporter with the Continental News Service; Elizabeth Evans, a friend of Pierre Salinger, one of Kennedy's campaign aides; and Irwin Stroll, a teenage Kennedy volunteer.

In a 2018 interview with The Washington Post, Robert F. Kennedy Jr. said that he had traveled to California to meet with Sirhan in prison and that, after a relatively long conversation (the details of which he would not disclose), believed that Sirhan did not kill his father and that a second gunman was involved.

Prosecution 
Even though Sirhan admitted his guilt in a recorded confession while in police custody on June 9, a lengthy, publicized trial followed in The People of the State of California v. Sirhan Sirhan. The judge did not accept Sirhan's confession and denied his request to withdraw his plea of "not guilty" in order to plead "guilty".

On February 10, 1969, Sirhan's lawyers made a motion in chambers to enter a plea of guilty to first-degree murder in exchange for life imprisonment rather than the death penalty. Sirhan told Judge Herbert V. Walker that he wanted to withdraw his original plea of not guilty in order to plead guilty as charged on all counts. He also asked that his counsel "dissociate themselves from this case completely." The judge asked him what he wanted to do about sentencing, and Sirhan replied, "I will ask to be executed." Walker denied the motion and said, "This court will not accept the plea." He also denied Sirhan's request for his counsel to withdraw; his counsel entered another motion to withdraw from the case of their own volition, but Walker denied that as well. Walker subsequently ordered that the record be sealed pertaining to the motion.

The trial proceeded, and opening statements began on February 12. The lead prosecutor in the case was Lynn "Buck" Compton, a World War II veteran of Easy Company fame who later became a justice of the California Court of Appeal. David Fitts delivered the prosecution's opening statement, providing examples of Sirhan's preparations to kill Kennedy. The prosecution showed that Sirhan was seen at the Ambassador Hotel on June 3, two nights before the attack, to learn the building's layout, and that he visited a gun range on June 4. Alvin Clark, Sirhan's garbage collector, testified that Sirhan had told him a month before the attack of his intention to shoot Kennedy.

Sirhan's defense counsel included attorney Grant Cooper, who had hoped to demonstrate that the killing had been the impulsive act of a man with a mental deficiency. But Walker admitted into evidence pages from three of Sirhan's journal notebooks that suggested the crime was premeditated and "quite calculating and willful". On March 3, Cooper asked Sirhan in direct testimony whether he had shot Kennedy; Sirhan replied, "Yes, sir", but then said that he did not bear Kennedy any ill will. Sirhan also testified that he had killed Kennedy "with twenty years of malice aforethought". He explained in an interview with David Frost in 1989 that this referred to the time since the creation of the State of Israel. He has maintained since then that he has no memory of the crime or of making that statement in court.

The defense based its case primarily on the expert testimony of Bernard L. Diamond, a professor of law and psychiatry, who testified that Sirhan was suffering from diminished capacity at the time of the murder.

Sirhan was convicted on April 17, 1969, and was sentenced six days later to death in the gas chamber. Three years later, his sentence was commuted to life in prison, owing to the California Supreme Court's decision in People v. Anderson, which ruled that capital punishment is a violation of the California Constitution's prohibition against cruel and unusual punishment. The February 1972 decision was retroactive, invalidating all existing death sentences in California.

Appeals
Sirhan's lawyer Lawrence Teeter later argued that Grant Cooper was compromised by a conflict of interest and was, as a consequence, grossly negligent in defense of his client. The defense moved for a new trial amid claims of setups, police bungles, hypnotism, brainwashing, blackmail and government conspiracies. On June 5, 2003, coincidentally the 35th anniversary of Kennedy's assassination, Teeter petitioned a federal court in Los Angeles to move the case to Fresno. He argued that Sirhan could not get a fair hearing in Los Angeles, where a man who helped prosecute him was then a federal judge: U.S. District Judge William Matthew Byrne Jr. in Los Angeles was an assistant U.S. attorney during Sirhan's trial, and part of the prosecutorial team.

Since 1994, Teeter had been trying to have state and federal courts overturn Sirhan's conviction, arguing his client was hypnotized and framed, possibly by a government conspiracy. During one hearing, Teeter referred to testimony from the original trial transcripts regarding a prosecution eyewitness to the attack, author George Plimpton, in which he said that Sirhan looked "enormously composed. He seemed ... purged." This statement coincided with the defense's argument that Sirhan had shot Kennedy while in some kind of hypnotic trance. The motion was denied. Teeter died in 2005, and Sirhan declined other counsel to replace him.

On November 26, 2011, Sirhan's defense teams filed court papers for a new trial, saying that "expert analysis of recently-uncovered evidence shows two guns were fired in the assassination and that Sirhan's revolver was not the gun that shot Kennedy" and he "should be freed from prison or granted a new trial based on 'formidable evidence', asserting his innocence and 'horrendous violations' of his rights".

On January 5, 2015, Sirhan's motion was denied by U.S. District Judge Beverly Reid O'Connell in Los Angeles, who said that Sirhan "failed to meet the showing required for actual innocence" that might excuse his having failed to seek his freedom sooner in federal court. In other words, Sirhan's case was not strong enough. "Though petitioner advances a number of theories regarding the events of June 5, 1968, petitioner does not dispute that he fired eight rounds of gunfire in the kitchen pantry of the Ambassador Hotel", O'Connell wrote. "Petitioner does not show that it is more likely than not that no juror, acting reasonably, would have found him guilty beyond a reasonable doubt."

Motives

A motive cited for Sirhan's actions is the Middle East conflict. After his arrest, Sirhan said, "I can explain it. I did it for my country." Sirhan believed that he was deliberately betrayed by Kennedy's support for Israel in the June 1967 Six-Day War, which had begun one year to the day before the assassination. During a search of Sirhan's apartment after his arrest, a spiral-bound notebook was found containing a diary entry that demonstrated that his anger had gradually fixated on Kennedy, who had promised to send 50 fighter jets to Israel if elected president. Sirhan's journal entry of May 18, 1968, read: "My determination to eliminate R.F.K. is becoming the more and more [sic] of an unshakable obsession...Kennedy must die before June 5th." They found other notebooks and diary entries expressing his growing rage at Kennedy; his journals also contained many aphorisms that were thought to be his version of "free writing". He wrote in support of communism: "Long live Communism... I firmly support the communist cause and its people... American capitalism will fall and give way to the worker's dictatorship."

The next day, on June 6, the Los Angeles Times printed an article by Jerry Cohen that discussed Sirhan's motive for the assassination, confirmed by the memos Sirhan wrote to himself. The article stated: "When the Jordanian nationalist, Sirhan Bishara Sirhan, allegedly shot Kennedy, ostensibly because of the senator's advocacy of U.S. support for Israel, the crime with which he was charged was in essence another manifestation of the centuries-old hatred between Arab and Jew."

M.T. Mehdi, then secretary-general of the Action Committee on American-Arab Relations, believed that Sirhan had acted in justifiable self-defense, stating: "Sirhan was defending himself against those 50 Phantom jets Kennedy was sending to Israel." Mehdi wrote a 100-page book on the subject called Kennedy and Sirhan: Why?

Later in prison, Sirhan claimed that he had been drunk. An interview with Sirhan in 1980 revealed new claims that a combination of liquor and anger over the anniversary of the 1967 Arab-Israeli war had triggered his actions. "You must remember the circumstances of that night, June 5. That was when I was provoked," Sirhan says, recorded in a transcript of one of his interviews with Mehdi, later president of the New York-based American-Arab Relations Committee. "That is when I initially went to observe the Jewish Zionist parade in celebration of the June 5, 1967, victory over the Arabs. That was the catalyst that triggered me on that night." Then Sirhan said, "In addition, there was the consumption of the liquor, and I want the public to understand that."

Imprisonment
In 1971, Sirhan was housed in the Adjustment Center at San Quentin State Prison. He was subsequently transferred to the Correctional Training Facility (CTF) in Soledad, California, where he was confined until 1992. From 1992 to 2009, he was confined at the California State Prison (COR) in Corcoran, California, and lived in COR's Protective Housing Unit until he was moved to a harsher lockdown at COR in 2003. In October 2009, ostensibly for his safety, he was transferred to the Pleasant Valley State Prison in Coalinga, California, where he was housed in a cell by himself. He was subsequently moved back to Corcoran.

On November 22, 2013, Sirhan was transferred from Corcoran to the Richard J. Donovan Correctional Facility in San Diego County. The transfer occurred on the 50th anniversary of the assassination of President John F. Kennedy, but a spokesman for the California Department of Corrections and Rehabilitation said that the transfer was "a routine matter of housing allotments" and its timing was "simply an unfortunate coincidence".

On August 30, 2019, Sirhan was stabbed multiple times by another prisoner. He was taken to a hospital, where his condition was reported as stable. He returned to the prison two days later, after his discharge from the hospital.

In a 1980 interview with M. T. Mehdi, Sirhan claimed that his actions were fueled by liquor and anger. He then complained that the parole board was not taking these "mitigating" circumstances into account when they continually denied his parole.

Supporters
In 1974, Bill Ayers and Bernardine Dohrn dedicated their communist manifesto Prairie Fire: The Politics of Revolutionary Anti-Imperialism to Sirhan (along with 200 others), hailing him as a courageous political prisoner. In February 1973, Sirhan's release was one of the demands of the Black September Organization, which took American hostages at the Saudi Arabian Embassy in Khartoum.

Parole applications and hearings
In 1982, Sirhan told the parole board: "I sincerely believe that if Robert Kennedy were alive today, I believe he would not countenance singling me out for this kind of treatment. I think he would be among the first to say that, however horrible the deed I committed 14 years ago was, that it should not be the cause for denying me equal treatment under the laws of this country."

Sirhan was denied parole for the 14th time in 2011. He was denied parole again in 2016, at his 15th parole hearing. One of Sirhan's shooting victims from that night, Paul Schrade, aged 91 at the time of the hearing, testified in his support, stating his belief that a second shooter killed Kennedy and that Sirhan was intended to be a distraction from the real gunman by an unknown conspiracy. Sirhan repeated his claim to have no memory of the shooting, saying: "It's all vague now. I'm sure you all have it in your records. I can't deny it or confirm it. I just wish this whole thing had never taken place." His parole was denied on the grounds that he had not expressed adequate remorse for his crime or acknowledged its severity.

On August 27, 2021, in his 16th appearance before the parole board, the board's two-person panel voted to grant Sirhan parole after finding that he no longer posed a threat to society. He had served 53 years in jail. Two of Kennedy's surviving sons, Robert F. Kennedy, Jr. and Douglas Kennedy, offered their support for parole during Sirhan's appearance before the parole board.  Parole Board Commissioner Robert Barton even stated to Sirhan “We think that you have grown.” The decision was subject to a 90-day review by the California Board of Parole Hearings after which the governor of California had 30 days to grant, reverse, or modify the decision.

Six other surviving children of Robert F. Kennedy—Joseph P. Kennedy II, Courtney Kennedy, Kerry Kennedy, Christopher G. Kennedy, Maxwell T. Kennedy, and Rory Kennedy—opposed parole for Sirhan, and urged the full parole board or Governor Gavin Newsom to reverse the recommendation. They filed a statement with the parole board on August 27, 2021, opposing Sirhan's release. Rory Kennedy wrote a guest essay in the New York Times saying that Sirhan did not deserve parole, citing his lack of remorse and unwillingness to accept responsibility.

Neither Los Angeles County District Attorney George Gascón nor any staff of his office appeared at the parole hearing or took any position on parole for Sirhan. This was a break from the previous practice of the prosecution, which had opposed parole in all of Sirhan's previous hearings. Upon taking office, Gascón had issued a directive that his office's "default policy" was not to attend parole hearings or take a position on parole.

The next step in the parole process is review "by the legal division of the Board of Parole Hearings, a process that can take up to about four months. If the lawyers find an error, they can send the case to the full slate of commissioners to review." If there is no reason to send the decision to the full board of commissioners, then it goes to the governor, who has 30 days to review it. It was later acknowledged that Sirhan's parole was also aided by a recent California law that required the parole board to consider things like age, health, and childhood trauma as mitigating factors – things it hadn't considered before.

On January 13, 2022, California Governor Gavin Newsom denied Sirhan's latest bid for parole. He wrote an op-ed in the Los Angeles Times stating that even though the state parole board had recommended Sirhan for parole, the severity of the crime and Sirhan's "current refusal to accept responsibility for it" led Newsom to deny the request.

At Sirhan's 16th parole hearing, on March 1, 2023, he was again denied parole. He will next be eligible for a parole hearing in 2026. Sirhan has waived his right to contest deportation if he is paroled.

See also

 RFK, a 2002 American television film
 Bobby, a 2006 American drama film 
 RFK Must Die, a 2007 investigative documentary 
 Notable Inmates at California State Prison, Corcoran
 Robert F. Kennedy's 1948 visit to Palestine
 List of people with reduplicated names

References

Further reading
 Jansen, Godfrey, Why Robert Kennedy Was Killed: The Story of Two Victims, New York, Third Press, 1970. .
 Kaiser, Robert Blair, "R.F.K. Must Die!": A History of the Robert Kennedy Assassination and Its Aftermath, New York, E.P. Dutton & Co, Inc. 1970.  .
 Kaiser, Robert Blair, "R.F.K. Must Die!": Chasing the Mystery of the Robert Kennedy Assassination, New York, Overlook Press, Peter Mayer Publishers, Inc. 2008.  .
 Melanson, Philip H., Who Killed Robert Kennedy?, Berkeley, California, Odonian, 1993.  .
 Turner, William V., and John G. Christian, The Assassination of Robert F. Kennedy: A Searching Look at the Conspiracy and Cover-up 1968–1978, New York, Random House, 1978. .
 Ayton, Mel, The Forgotten Terrorist: Sirhan Sirhan and the Assassination of Robert F. Kennedy, Washington, D.C., Potomac Books, 2007.  .
 Mehdi, Mohammad Taki, Kennedy and Sirhan: Why?, New World Press, 1968. Edition: Illustrated Paperback, 100 pages. .

External links
 
 The Assassination of Robert F. Kennedy. By Joseph Geringer. Crime Library biography.
 Interview with Sirhan's attorney Lawrence Teeter on KPFA 94.1 / Guns & Butter show
 Statement of Sirhan Sirhan's former lawyer, Lawrence Teeter, released on the 30th anniversary of the murder of Robert Kennedy.
 "The Robert Kennedy Assassination: Unraveling the Conspiracy Theories". Mel Ayton, Crime Magazine May 8, 2005
 Refugees.  Los Angeles Daily Mirror story about Sirhan working as a delivery boy at a Pasadena health food store. June 23, 2007.
 The lost significance of Sirhan's case. Organization of Arab Students. University of Southern California. Los Angeles, 1969. A brief excerpt from Sirhans testimony that the editor claims was ignored by the press.
 The Real Manchurian Candidate Dr. Daniel Brown, a leading expert on hypnosis and coercive persuasion at Harvard Medical School discusses Sirhan's case and range mode programming. 2018.

1944 births
Living people
20th-century criminals
Assassination of Robert F. Kennedy
Jordanian communists
Jordanian emigrants to the United States
Jordanian people convicted of murder
Jordanian people imprisoned abroad
Jordanian people of Palestinian descent
Jordanian prisoners sentenced to death
Jordanian prisoners sentenced to life imprisonment
Palestinian assassins
Palestinian communists
Palestinian emigrants to the United States
Palestinian people convicted of murder
Palestinian people imprisoned abroad
Palestinian prisoners sentenced to death
Palestinian prisoners sentenced to life imprisonment
Pasadena City College alumni
People convicted of murder by California
People from Greater Los Angeles
People from Jerusalem
Prisoners sentenced to death by California
Prisoners sentenced to life imprisonment by California
Jordanian nationalists
Jordanian Christians
Palestinian Christians
Former Seventh-day Adventists
Anti-Zionism in the United States
Rosicrucians